Events from the year 1785 in Sweden

Incumbents
 Monarch – Gustav III

Events

 - Enskiftet begins in Scania. 
 - The Barber of Seville is played for the first time in Sweden at the Stenborg Theatre in Stockholm, with Christina Rahm and Kjell Waltman. 
 -  by Johan Fredric Bagge
 - Passionerna by Thomas Thorild

Births
 23 January – Carl Adolph Agardh, botanist   (died 1859)
 February - Anna Sundström, chemist  (died 1871)
 6 May – Arvid August Afzelius, historian and mythologist (died 1871)
 5 October – Lasse-Maja, notorious criminal (died 1845)
  – Mariana Koskull, royal mistress (died 1841)

Deaths
 30 October – Gustaf Filip Creutz, diplomat and poet (born 1731)
 16 November – Johan Gottschalk Wallerius, chemist and mineralogist (born 1709)
  - Lovisa von Plat, brothel madam (unknown birthyear)

References

 
Years of the 18th century in Sweden
Sweden